Clube Desportivo da Marinha de Guerra is a handball club from Luanda, Angola. The club's men's and women's handball teams compete at the local level, at the Luanda Provincial Handball Championship and at the Angola National Handball Championship as well as at continental level, at the annual African Handball Champions League competitions.

The men's team made its debut at the Angolan handball league in 2009 whereas the women's team in 2012.

The club is attached to the Angolan Navy and is an affiliate to C.D. Primeiro de Agosto

Squad (Men)

Players

2011–2017

Manager history
  Nelson Catito – 2018
  Júlio Caxito – 2016, 2017
  Victor Tchikoulaev – 2015
  João Florêncio – 2014
  Júlio Caxito – 2012

Squad (Women)

Players

2011–2017

Manager history
  João Diogo Docas – 2018
  Alfredo Alvarez – 2016
  Quinteiro Teresa – 2014, 2015
  Pedro Pinto – 2012

See also
Marinha Basketball
Federação Angolana de Andebol

References

Angolan handball clubs
Sports clubs in Luanda